Maria Baciu  (born 4 March 1942 in Todireni,  Botoșani) is a Romanian poet, professor, and literary critic. She also writes novels, for adults as well as children. In 2006, she received the 2005 award from the Writers' Union of Romania for children's literature. She teaches at the Liceul Pedagogic (Pedagogical High School) in Botoșani.

Biography 
Maria Baciu was born on March 4, 1942, in Cernești, Todireni, Botoșani County. In 1966, she graduated from the Faculty of Philology of Alexandru Ioan Cuza University of Iași. From 1966 to 1970 she was a teacher of Romanian language and literature at the Theoretical Lyceum Trusesti, and from 1970 at the Regular school "N. Iorga" of Botoșani, moving later to the Pedagogical High School there. She became remarkable for her great didactic activity.

Baciu served as Editor-in-Chief of the Sotron children's magazine in 1994–1996 and of thePardon! magazine for adolescents. In 1980, she founded the Literary Circle M. Eminescu, then in 1983 edited the publication The Educator. In parallel with her departmental and editorial work, she published lyrics, literary articles and reviews in numerous newspapers and magazines. In addition she wrote children's prose, a book of teaching methods for schools, and another on theater for children.

Publications

"Oglinzi", versuri, Iași, Junimea, 1988
"Buna dimineata, Puf", poezii pentru copii, Botoșani, Inspectoratul Scolar al jud. Botoșani, 1994
"Cartea cu semnele rupte", poezii, Botoșani, Eldos, 1995
"Daruri de Crăciun", poezii pentru copii, Iaşi, Fides, 1996
"Lume îndrăzneaţă", Botoșani, Grafik Art, 1998
"Zodie cu...otrăvuri", Botoşani, Grafik Art, 1998
"Fetiţa cu buline", versuri, Timișoara, Ed. Augusta, 2000
"Vremea fragilor", poezii pentru copii, Augusta, Timișoara, 2000
"Vinovatul spectacol", poezii, Ed. Augusta, Timișoara, 2001
Necuprinsele iubiri. Anthology of Baciu's poetry. Augusta, Timișoara, 2003
Ţara ionuţilor pozitivi. Novel. Grafik-Art, Botoșani, 2003
"Neimblinzitele cercuri", Timișoara, Helicon
Pelerinul ("The Pilgrim"). Poems. 2006
Ghetuţele copilăriei. Novel for young adults. Axa, 2009
Et in Arcadia ego. Novel. Axa, 2009

Bibliography
Silvia Lazarovici, Dicționarul scriitorilor botoșăneni. Geea, 2000.
Gellu Dorian, Nord – Antologia poeților botoșăneni de azi. Axa, 2009.

References

Romanian women poets
People from Botoșani County
1942 births
Living people
Romanian women novelists
Romanian women children's writers
Romanian children's writers
20th-century Romanian poets
21st-century Romanian poets
20th-century Romanian women writers
21st-century Romanian women writers
Alexandru Ioan Cuza University alumni